Biseri (trans. The Pearls) were a Yugoslav rock band formed in Zagreb in 1965.

During the 1960s Biseri performed beat and rhythm and blues. In the 1970s they moved towards pop rock, but failed to achieve larger popularity and disbanded in 1980. Although they were not among the earliest Yugoslav rock bands, Biseri, as other Yugoslav 1960s rock bands, played a pioneering role on the Yugoslav rock scene.

History

1965-1980
Biseri were formed in 1965 by Robert Marinčić (vocals), Vladimir Kočiš "Zec" (guitar, vocals), Boris Bregović (guitar), Vladimir Hlady (bass guitar) and Milorad Perić (drums). Initially the band played beat and rhythm and blues and performed mostly in Zagreb clubs Centar (Center) and Mladost (Youth). Soon after the formation they appeared in the popular TV show Koncert za ludi mladi svet (Concert for Crazy Young World) performing the songs "Pokucaj o drvo" ("Knock on Wood") and "Set My Soul".

In 1969, after numerous lineup changes, a stable lineup was formed: Vladimir Kočiš (guitar, vocals), Vladimir Hlady (bass guitar), Slavko Pintarić (drums) and Ranko Marton (keyboards). During this year the band released their debut record, a 7" single with the songs "Anuška" ("Anoushka") and "Naša ljubav" ("Our Love"). For Radio Zagreb the band recorded the song "Život, to smo mi" ("Life, It's Us"), which became a radio hit, but was never officially released. The band enjoyed local popularity, but failed to achieve nationwide success.

In the 1970s the band turned towards pop-oriented sound. They released three 7" singles during the 1970s, but failed to gain larger popularity and disbanded in 1980.

During the band's history a great number of musicians passed through the band, including vocalist Zoran Antoljak (formerly of Grešnici and Zlatni Akordi), guitarist Željko Kovačević "Pes" (formerly of Mladi, Delfini and Zlatni Akordi), rhythm guitarist Čedo Juzbašić, bass guitarist Igor Franulović, keyboardist Dragutin Horvat, and others. After leaving Biseri, Pintarić moved to Soul Soul Band, and later to Srebrna Krila.

Post breakup
After Biseri disbanded Kočiš joined Novi Fosili.

The song "Anuška" was published on the box set Kad je rock bio mlad - Priče sa istočne strane (1956-1970) (When Rock Was Young - East Side Stories (1956-1970)), released by Croatia Records in 2005 and featuring songs by the pioneering Yugoslav rock acts.

Discography

Singles
"Anuška" / "Naša ljubav" (1969)
"Igra" / "Želim da ti dam" (1970)
"Vidim te u snu" / "Zbog stare navike" (1974)
"Sve dok muzika svira" / "Ti si moja mladost" (1975)

Other appearances
"Hej mala" (Zagreb '79, 1979)

References

External links 
Biseri at Discogs

Croatian rock music groups
Yugoslav rock music groups
Yugoslav rhythm and blues musical groups
Instrumental rock musical groups
Beat groups
Musical groups established in 1965
Musical groups disestablished in 1980